Lim Jae-hyeok (born 6 February 1999) is a South Korean football forward who plays for Thai League 1 club Police Tero.

Club career statistics

References

1999 births
Living people
Association football forwards
South Korean footballers
Daegu FC players
K League 1 players
Lim Jae-hyeok
Lim Jae-hyeok